The 2008–09 season saw Exeter City competed in Football League Two, alongside the FA Cup, Football League Cup and Football League Trophy.

Competitions

Football League Two

Results

FA Cup

Football League Cup

Football League Trophy

Season squad

Players who left during the season

References 

Exeter City F.C. seasons
Exeter City F.C.